Gadisar Lake also called Gadaria Lake is located in the Jaisalmer district of the Indian state of Rajasthan. It was built by the founder of Jaisalmer, King Rawal Jaisal in 1156 AD and later rebuilt by Gadsi Singh around 1367 AD. This lake is an artificial lake. The lake is located about 1.5 km from Jaisalmer Fort. It is said that this lake once provided water to the entire city. Presently, the water comes in the Gadisar Lake from Indira Gandhi Canal, so it never dries.

History 
Gadisar Lake is an artificial lake. It is located in the southern part of the city of Jaisalmer. This lake was built by the founder king of Jaisalmer Rawal Jaisal. Due to this, it was also called Jaisalasar Lake earlier. At that time it was the only water source of the Jaisalmer region. Later the lake was rebuilt by Gadsi Singh and after that it was renamed as Gadisar Lake. Presently, there are many tourists from abroad. The lake also has many chhatris and shrines of hindu Gods and goddesses.

Climate

Photo gallery

References

Lakes of Rajasthan
Tourist attractions in Jaisalmer district
Artificial lakes of India
Water Heritage Sites in India